Dagana District is a district located in Bhutan. Most of the district is populated by Dzongkha speakers. However, in the southwest part near the Sarpang District, Nepali is also spoken as a native language.

Administrative divisions
Dagana District itself is divided into fourteen village blocks (or gewogs):

Dorona Gewog
Drujegang Gewog
Gesarling Gewog
Goshi Gewog
Karmaling Gewog
Kana Gewog
Khebisa Gewog
Lajab Gewog
Lhamoy Zingkha Gewog
Nichula Gewog
Tashiding Gewog
Tsangkha Gewog
Tsendagang Gewog
Tseza Gewog

Environment
Like most of the districts of Bhutan, Dagana contains environmentally protected areas. In southeastern Dagana that is along the border with India, lies the western half of Phibsoo Wildlife Sanctuary, covering parts of Karmaling, Lhamoy Zingkha and Nichula Gewogs. Phibsoo has no human inhabitants. It has districts that are habituated by Nepali speaking people. Daga Zong can be reached only by one single passage.

History
On April 26, 2007, Lhamoy Zingkha Dungkhag (sub-district) was formally handed over from Sarpang Dzongkhag to Dagana Dzongkhag, having an impact on three gewogs (Lhamoy Zingkha, Deorali and Nichula (Zinchula) and the town of Lhamoy Zingkha, which formed the westernmost part of Sarpang Dzongkhag and now forms the southernmost part of Dagana Dzongkhag.

See also
Daga Province

References

External links
 Official dzongkha profile with map of gewogs

 
Districts of Bhutan